Medieval accolade may refer to:
 Accolade (also known as dubbing or adoubement), the central act in the rite-of-passage ceremonies conferring knighthood in the Middle Ages
 Scholastic accolade, see List of Latin nicknames of the Middle Ages